Stone heart may refer to:
 Stone heart Syndrom
 Stoneheart trilogy